JS Academy for the Deaf is a nonprofit organization in Karachi, Pakistan, aiming at teaching deaf and hearing-impaired children to read and write. It was founded by Laila Dossa in 2004. Presently she is the chairperson.

JS Academy's main supporter is the Mahvash & Jahangir Siddiqui Foundation. 

The Academy serves 150 families with deaf and hearing impaired children. It has a library, physical education, art, science, sewing..

References

External links

Organizations established in the 2000s
Schools for the deaf in Pakistan